New Salem Township is located in McDonough County, Illinois. As of the 2010 census, its population was 369 and it contained 168 housing units. It is Township 5 North, Range 1 West of the Fourth Principal Meridian.

Geography

Demographics

References

External links
City-data.com
Illinois State Archives

Townships in McDonough County, Illinois
Townships in Illinois